Club Deportivo Portugués (usually called Portugués) was a professional football club and the club has won four First Division titles in the professional era. The club is based in Caracas.

Titles

National
Primera División Venezolana: 4
Winners (4): 1958, 1960, 1962, 1967
Copa Venezuela: 2
Winners (2): 1959, 1972

International
Copa Simón Bolívar: 0
Runner-up (1): 1972

References

Football clubs in Venezuela
Football clubs in Caracas
Defunct football clubs in Venezuela